James Tuchet, 7th Earl of Castlehaven (15 April 1723 – 6 May 1769) was the son of James Tuchet, 6th Earl of Castlehaven and his wife, née Elizabeth Arundell.

He succeeded his father as Earl of Castlehaven and Baron Audley on 12 October 1740.

He was unmarried, and was succeeded on his death in 1769 by his brother, John. He was a Christian Earl who owned much land and donated parts of the proceeds to the church.

References

Castlehaven, James Tuchet, 7th Earl of
Castlehaven, James Tuchet, 7th Earl of
07
17